The 2022 LTP Men's Open was a professional tennis tournament played on hardcourts in Charleston, United States. It was the first edition of the tournament and was organized as an event on the 2022 ATP Challenger Tour. It was scheduled to be played between September 26 and October 2, 2022, but the tournament was canceled after completion of play on September 28 due to the forecasted impacts of Hurricane Ian on South Carolina. All players received the ranking points and prize money they would have earned for the rounds they reached.

Singles main-draw entrants

Seeds

 1 Rankings are as of 19 September 2022.

Other entrants
The following players received wildcards into the singles main draw:
  Cannon Kingsley
  Ethan Quinn
  Gianni Ross

The following player received entry into the singles main draw using a protected ranking:
  Andrew Harris

The following players received entry into the singles main draw as alternates:
  Charles Broom
  Aidan McHugh

The following players received entry from the qualifying draw:
  August Holmgren
  Garrett Johns
  Strong Kirchheimer
  Patrick Kypson
  Giovanni Oradini
  Donald Young

The following players received entry as lucky losers:
  Omni Kumar
  Govind Nanda
  Tennys Sandgren

Champions

Singles

tournament canceled after first round

Doubles

tournament canceled after first round

References

2022 ATP Challenger Tour
2022 in American tennis
September 2022 sports events in the United States
October 2022 sports events in the United States